Przysłup  (Pryslip) is a village in the administrative district of Gmina Cisna, within Lesko County, Subcarpathian Voivodeship, in south-eastern Poland, close to the border with Slovakia.

The village has a population of 70.

The village is situated by the grand Bieszczady loop road and is a popular tourist place, with inns and folk art galleries. There is an ending station of Bieszczadzka Forest Railway in Przysłup.

References

Villages in Lesko County